Cartodere constricta, the plaster beetle, is a 1.3—2.0 mm long species of minute brown scavenger beetle in the family Latridiidae. Originally from the Palearctic, it now also occurs in the Nearctic. It is found throughout Europe and North Africa, east across Siberia to the Russian Far East, and south to Pakistan, India, China and Japan. It also occurs across southern Canada and throughout the USA. It is a mold feeder often found in: stored products such as grains and dry fruit, houses, feed mills, grain elevators, manure heaps and plant detritus. To get rid of this species, the key is drying out the problem area enough to stop mold growth; in general, reduce RH below 20%.

References

Further reading

External links

 

Latridiidae
Beetles of Europe
Beetles of North America
Beetles described in 1827
Taxa named by Leonard Gyllenhaal
Articles created by Qbugbot